The Murder of Princess Diana is a 2007 Lifetime Television movie, directed by John Strickland and starring Jennifer Morrison as an American reporter. The film was based on the book by Noel Botham. Reg Gadney and Emma Reeves wrote the teleplay.

Cast 
 Jennifer Morrison: Rachel Visco
 Grégori Derangère: Thomas Sylvestre
 Kevin McNally: Charles Davis
 François Marthouret: Bertrand
 Lucien Jean-Baptiste: Martin
 Myriam Muller: Lucille Lechaim
 Raymond Coulthard: Anthony
 Denis Braccini: Henri Paul
 Nathalie Brocker: Princess Diana

Reception 
A review by Mike Hale in The New York Times described it as being "a compendium of Diana conspiracy theories" and "an uneasy combination of crime thriller, romantic melodrama and snuff film, it doesn’t ask us to suspend our disbelief so much as overcome our gag reflex". Barry Garron of the Associated Press previewed the film: "Although filmed on location, the production values are about what you might expect from a film school project".

References

External links

2007 television films
2007 films
Films about Diana, Princess of Wales
Lifetime (TV network) films
Films based on non-fiction books
2000s English-language films